Pippi on the Run (original Swedish title: På rymmen med Pippi Långstrump) is a 1970 Swedish/West German movie, sequel of Pippi in the South Seas with the cast of the 1969 TV series Pippi Longstocking. It is the last entry in the original TV and movie series and the only one to not be based on any of the previous books witten by Astrid Lindgren. Lindgren eventually wrote a book adaptation of the movie. It was released in the US in 1977.

Plot
Fed up with their strict parents, Tommy and Annika run away from home, with their friend Pippi Longstocking to look after them in their long trek.

Cast 
 Inger Nilsson – Pippi Longstocking
 Pär Sundberg – Tommy
 Maria Persson – Annika
 Hans Alfredson – Konrad the peddler
 Öllegård Wellton – Tommy and Annika's mother
 Fredrik Ohlsson – Tommy and Annika's father

See also
Pippi Longstocking – The character
Pippi Longstocking – The TV series

References

External links
 

tisdag 23 februari 2021

1970 films
1970s adventure comedy films
Swedish adventure comedy films
West German films
Films directed by Olle Hellbom
Films based on Pippi Longstocking
Films set in Sweden
1970 comedy films
1970s Swedish films